Graveyard Alive: A Zombie Nurse in Love, is an independent zombie horror/comedy directed by Elza Kephart.  The film is in black and white and it is dubbed. The film, had its world premiere at the 2003 Fantasia festival in Montreal, Canada, and its U.S. premier at the 2004 Slamdance festival in Park City, Utah where it won best Cinematography.
The movie was made by Bastard Amber Productions, and it was filmed in Montreal, Quebec, Canada. The movie was featured in Nightmare in Canada: Canadian Horror on Film (2004) (Doc)

Synopsis

Patsy Powers (Day-Jones) is a homely nurse who pines for handsome Dr. Dox (Gerhardt). Unfortunately for Patsy, the well-favoured physician only has eyes for pretty Goodie Tueshuez (Slan) - a jealous-minded nurse obsessed with popularity. When a foul-smelling woodsman is admitted to the hospital with an axe imbedded in his forehead, the rest of the nurse staff runs for cover as kindly Patsy and the injured worker form a warm bond. Later, after Patsy and the rugged lumberjack share a kiss, the smitten nurse is thrown off guard when her new beau reflexively sinks his teeth into her flesh. As Patsy runs off to bandage her wound, Eastern European doctor-turned-janitor Kapotski recognizes the woodsman as a zombie and ends the man's suffering with a stake through the head. In the days that follow, Patsy's body is gradually taken over by the zombie virus. Not only does the transformation aversely affect Patsy's eating habits, it instills her with a newfound confidence that quickly catches the eye of Dr. Dox as well. Perplexed by her mousy co-worker's sudden transformation and determined to keep Dr. Dox for herself, the scheming Goody soon sets out to uncover the secret of Patsy's rising popularity. Now, as Patsy struggles to stay well fed and Dr. Dox grows increasingly inpatient with Goodie's unpalatable jealousy, the stage is set for a romance fueled by enough passion to transcend life and death.

Cast

Anne Day-Jones   - Patsy Powers
Karl Gerhardt  - Dr. Dox
Samantha Slan  - Goodie Tueshuze
Eric Kendric  -  Woodcutter
Roland Laroche  - Kapotski
Roger Guetta  - Hospital Administrator

Production credits

Annie MacDonald  - Executive Producer
Elza Kephart  - Producer
Patricia Gomez  - Producer
Andrea Stark  - Producer
Charles Jodoin-Keaton  - Co-Producer
Jessica Andrews  - Associate Producer
John Ashmore  - Cinematographer

Awards
Kodak Vision Award for Best Cinematography at the 2004 Slamdance film festival

Nominated at the 2005 Cinevagas B-Movie film festival for:

 Best B Movie
 Best Director
 Best Screenplay
 Karl Gerhardt for best actor
 Anne Day-Jones for best actress
 Samantha Slan for best supporting actress
 Martin Pelland for best music score
 John Ashmore for best cinematography
 Caroline Meyer & Sarah Hagan for best set design
 Stephanie Olivier for best editing

References

External links

 
 Graveyard Alive: A Zombie Nurse In Love - Exclaim! review
 Graveyard Alive - A Zombie Nurse in Love - Film Threat review (3.5 stars)
 Graveyard Alive: A Zombie Nurse in Love - The Globe and Mail review

2000s comedy horror films
Zombie comedy films
Films shot in Montreal
2005 films
Canadian comedy horror films
Canadian zombie films
English-language Canadian films
2003 comedy films
2003 films
2005 comedy films
2000s English-language films
2000s Canadian films